This List of Ford platforms features automobile platforms developed by Ford Motor Company, its present-day subsidiaries, as well as those shared from subsidiaries from the past (Mazda, Mercury, Volvo, Jaguar, and Land Rover).

Ford announced in 2014 plans to reduce its vehicle platforms from sixteen to nine.  In 2014, Ford vehicles were built on fifteen distinct platforms.  This only applies to Ford and Lincoln and not to any brands that were previously held by the company (such as Mazda and Volvo), and is expected to cut costs by 20%.  

As of  there are five global platforms and four regional platforms. The regional platforms are only sold in some continents and not others.

Table Fields
 Image: Photograph of a single example of each automotive platform.
 Platform: Platform code name, linking to article (in some cases, platform articles are substituted with vehicle articles)
 Type: Refers to types of car classification each platform vehicle falls under
 Drive: Driven wheels in the drivetrain (front, rear, all, or four-wheel drive)
 Production: Years produced, if not currently in production
 Region: Primary market for platform vehicles (on a single platform, this can vary by brand and is noted)
 Example(s): The nameplates produced on the platform
 VIN code: code on the VIN that designates each platform variation (typically with several vehicles produced on a single platform)

List

Current Ford platforms

Virtually all Ford and Lincoln vehicles will use these platforms globally by 2016.

Current Ford platforms (global)

Historic Ford Motor Company platforms (global)

Ford Global Truck/Van/SUV/CUV platforms (current/historic)

References

 
Ford platforms